Loperamide/simethicone is combination medication marketed under the trade name Imodium Multi-Symptom Relief (formerly Imodium A-D Advanced) used to treat diarrhea and gas simultaneously. It is manufactured by the McNeil Consumer Healthcare Division of McNeil PPC, Inc. It contains loperamide and simethicone.

Loperamide is a μ-opioid receptor agonist that works in the intestines. Although it is an opioid, it has no effects on the central nervous system. It reduces diarrhea by slowing the transit time of contents through the intestinal tract thereby allowing more water to be reabsorbed from the intestinal lumen.

Simethicone reduces gas by allowing smaller gas bubbles to coalesce into larger bubbles in the intestinal tract, making them easier to pass. Simethicone is not absorbed from the gastrointestinal tract so there are no systemic side effects.

Precautions
Anti-diarrheal medications should be avoided if diarrhea is secondary to an infection. Avoid using such products in the presence of fever, black stools, bloody stools, or stools containing mucus.

References

External links 
 

Antidiarrhoeals
Synthetic opioids
Combination drugs
Mu-opioid receptor agonists